Elysium was a melodic death metal band from Wrocław, Poland, created in Spring 1996 by Maciej Miskiewicz (vocals), Michał Maryniak (guitar), Marcin Maryniak (bass), Mariusz Bogacz (drums) and Tomasz Kochaniec (keyboards). Half their discography was released on Metal Mind Productions, a major Polish indie label.

Discography
 1997: Sunset (Demo)
 2000: Elysium (Elysium)
 2000: Dreamlands (Morbid Noizz/Black Mark)
 2001: Eclipse (Metal Mind Productions) 	
 2003: Feedback (Metal Mind Productions)
 2004: Deadline (Metal Mind Productions)
 2005: Godfather (Empire Records)

References

External links
 
 
 

Polish melodic death metal musical groups
Musical quartets
Musical groups established in 1996